Dzilam de Bravo Municipality (In the Yucatec Maya Language: “fierce peeling” is one of the 106 municipalities in the Mexican state of Yucatán containing  (241.43 km2) of land and located roughly 107 km northeast of the city of Mérida.

History
During pre-Hispanic times, the town fell within the provinces under the chieftainship of Cheles. After the conquest the area became part of the encomienda system. In 1544 Francisco de Montejo established a town at the site.

Yucatán declared its independence from the Spanish Crown in 1821 and in 1825, the area was assigned to the Coastal region with its headquarters in Izamal. From 1900 to 1921 Dzilam de Bravo was a part of the Dzilam González Municipality. In 1921 it was separated to form its own municipality.

Governance
The municipal president is elected for a three-year term. The town council has four councilpersons, who serve as Secretary and councilors of public works and public planning and beautification.

The Municipal Council administers the business of the municipality. It is responsible for budgeting and expenditures and producing all required reports for all branches of the municipal administration. Annually it determines educational standards for schools.

The Police Commissioners ensure public order and safety. They are tasked with enforcing regulations, distributing materials and administering rulings of general compliance issued by the council.

Communities
The head of the municipality is Dzilam de Bravo, Yucatán. The other populated areas include El Cerrito, Espoquin Chico, Noh-Yaxché, Pueblo Nuevo, San Alfredo, San José, X-tabán and Yalcubul. The significant populations are shown below:

Local festivals
Every year from the 10 to 13 June they celebrate the festival in honor of San Antonio de Padua, patron saint of the town.

Tourist attractions
Church of San Antonio de Padua built in the 16th century
Church of the Immaculate Conception built in the 16th century
Church of St. Peter built in the 17th century
Cenote Elepetén
Bolmay archaeological site
Palaban archaeological site
Petul archaeological site
Poxil archaeological site
Sotpol archaeological site
Tamba archaeological site
Xalau archaeological site
Xcan archaeological site
Xcoom archaeological site
Xmaos archaeological site
Xuyap archaeological site
Parque San Felipe

References

Municipalities of Yucatán